Rebecca is a city in Turner County, Georgia, United States, along the Alapaha River. The population was 246 at the 2000 census.

History
The Georgia General Assembly incorporated Rebecca as a town in 1904. The community was named after Rebecca Clark, the daughter of a local resident. A post office called Rebecca has been in operation since 1902.

Geography

Rebecca is located at  (31.806385, -83.487833).

Demographics

As of the census of 2000, there were 246 people, 87 households, and 66 families residing in the city. The racial makeup of the city was 76.42% White, 20.33% African American, 0.81% Native American, and 2.44% from two or more races. Hispanic or Latino people of any race were 0.81% of the population.

There were 87 households, out of which 35.6% had children under the age of 18 living with them, 64.4% were married couples living together, 6.9% had a female householder with no husband present, and 23.0% were non-families. 20.7% of all households were made up of individuals, and 13.8% had someone living alone who was 65 years of age or older.  The average household size was 2.83 and the average family size was 3.25.

In the city, the population was spread out, with 28.9% under the age of 18, 7.3% from 18 to 24, 23.6% from 25 to 44, 21.1% from 45 to 64, and 19.1% who were 65 years of age or older.  The median age was 37 years. For every 100 females, there were 96.8 males.  For every 100 females age 18 and over, there were 90.2 males.

The median income for a household in the city was $31,875, and the median income for a family was $43,125. Males had a median income of $28,125 versus $21,806 for females. The per capita income for the city was $12,881.  About 10.0% of families and 15.8% of the population were below the poverty line, including 25.9% of those under the age of eighteen and 15.6% of those 65 or over.

References

Cities in Georgia (U.S. state)
Cities in Turner County, Georgia